Wolfgang Leibnitz (born 1936 in Meerane) is a German classical pianist.

Einspielungen 
 Franz Schubert: Sonate B-Dur, Moments musicaux, NYX, Holzkirchen 1999 (CD).
 Klaviersuiten des 20. Jahrhunderts von Debussy, Bartók, Strawinsky und Baur, VDE-Gallo, Lausanne, 2001 (CD).
 Frédéric Chopin: Sonata b-Moll, 24 Preludes, VDE-Gallo, Lausanne, 2002 (CD)
 Frédéric Chopin: Selected piano pieces, VDE-Gallo, Lausanne, 2002 (CD)
 Franz Liszt: Les jeux d´eau à la Villa d´Este, Sonata H-moll, Mephisto Walzer, VDE Gallo 2008 (CD)
 Klassische Klavierstücke von Leibnitz, Haydn, Mozart und Beethoven, VDE-Gallo, Lausanne, 2011 (CD)
 Robert Schumann, Papillons Opus 2 among others, VDE-Gallo, Lausanne, 2011 (CD)
 Franz Schubert: Klavierwerke,  VDE-Gallo, Lausanne, 2011

Bibliography 
CD 2: Neueinspielung der Winterreise (Schubert) by Florian Prey (baritone) and Wolfgang Leibnitz (piano).

References

External links 
 Homepage
 Wolfgang Leibnitz on Amazon
 Pianist Wolfgang Leibnitz gastierte im Norddorfer Gemeindehaus on Amrum-news
 Dimitri schostakowitsch Cellosonate op.40 Franz Amann Cello Wolfgang Leibnitz Klavier (YouTube)

1936 births
Living people
People from Meerane
German classical pianists
Male classical pianists
20th-century German musicians
21st-century classical pianists
20th-century German male musicians
21st-century German male musicians